Chaudhary Chand Ram (1923–2015) was an Indian politician and first Deputy Chief Minister of Haryana.

He was member of the 1st & 3rd Punjab Assembly and 1st, 2nd, 3rd & 4th Haryana Assembly of India. He also served as the member of 6th and 9th Lok Sabha.

Early life
Chaudhary Chand Ram was born on 23 June 1923 in Kharhar, Rohtak at Punjab. He did his graduation from DAV College, Lahore and Postgraduate in Economics. His family was influenced from Arya Samaj movement.

He was a champion of Dalit cause in Punjab and was a close associate of B. R. Ambedkar.

Chand Ram played a significant part in struggle for a separate Haryana state from Punjab.

Positions held

He was conferred with Babu Parmanand National Award in  2013.

He died on 15 June 2015 at the age of 92 years.

References

|-

|-

1923 births
2015 deaths
Members of the Punjab Legislative Assembly
Members of the Haryana Legislative Assembly
Deputy chief ministers of Haryana
India MPs 1977–1979
India MPs 1989–1991
Lok Sabha members from Uttar Pradesh
Lok Sabha members from Haryana